Lijie is a Chinese female given name. Notable people with the name include:

 Cui Lijie (born 1959), Chinese billionaire businesswoman
 Liu Lijie (born 1977), Chinese field hockey player
 Miao Lijie (born 1981), Chinese basketball player
 Niu Lijie (born 1969), Chinese football player
 Wei Lijie (scientist) (born 1974), Chinese Antarctic researcher
 Wei Lijie (table tennis), Chinese international table tennis player

See also 
 Li Jie (disambiguation), multiple people

Chinese given names
Feminine given names